Joe Abbenda (born July 4, 1939) is an American former professional bodybuilder during the early to mid-1960s. He competed in the tall man competitions, and as an amateur won the Teen Mr. America in 1959, AAU Mr. America and the amateur NABBA Mr. Universe competition in 1962, and was the professional winner a year later, in the 1963 Mr. Universe.

He is of Italian descent, and at the time of competing in championships, was one of only two Italian-Americans to have done so. He attended Adelphi University in 1957.

List of competitions

Media appearances 
Joe Abbenda has been featured in magazines such as Health and Strength, IronMan, Strength and Health, and Muscular Development. He appeared as himself on the April 1, 1963 episode of To Tell the Truth, not receiving any of the four possible votes.

References

1939 births
Living people
American bodybuilders
American people of Italian descent
Male bodybuilders
People associated with physical culture
Professional bodybuilders